North Ossetia, officially the Republic of North Ossetia–Alania, is a republic of Russia situated in the North Caucasus of Eastern Europe. Its population according to the 2021 Census was 687,357. The republic's capital city is the city of Vladikavkaz, located on the foothills of the Caucasus Mountains.

Forming 65.1% of the republic's population as of 2010, the Ossetians are an Iranian ethnic group native to the republic and neighboring South Ossetia. Ossetian is an east Iranian language descended from the medieval Alanic and ancient Sarmatian languages. Unlike many groups in the North Caucasus, Ossetians are predominantly Christians. However, almost 30% of the population adheres to Ossetian ethnic religion, generally called Uatsdin (Уацдин, "True Faith"), and a sizable Muslim minority exists. Ethnic Russians and Ingush, who form a majority in neighboring Ingushetia, form substantial minorities in the republic.

The Ossetia region traces its history back to the ancient Alans, who founded the Kingdom of Alania in the 8th century and adopted Christianity in the 9th century. The kingdom would fall to the Mongols in the 13th century, and by the 17th century would be under the nominal rule of Safavid Iran. From 1774 to 1806, Ossetia was slowly incorporated into the Russian Empire, which would split the region into a northern part included in the Terek Oblast, and a southern one included in the Tiflis and Kutaisi governorates. This partition would persist in the Soviet period, where North Ossetia was made into the Mountain Autonomous Soviet Socialist Republic within the Russian SFSR, while South Ossetia became an autonomous oblast within the Georgian SSR.

Following the dissolution of the Soviet Union, the republic experienced internal conflict like in much of the North Caucasus. In 1992, a brief ethnic war between Ossetians and the predominantly Muslim Ingush population in the Prigorodny District took place. The republic has experienced spillover from the Chechen conflict, most notably in the form of the 2004 Beslan school siege. Proposals for Russia to annex South Ossetia in order to incorporate the two as one entity exist to this day. 

Ossetian cuisine is distinguished as an integral aspect of Ossetian culture. Ossetian-style pies such as Fydzhin (a meat pie) are a quintessential component of Ossetian cuisine. The "three pies" concept holds special symbolic significance, and representing the Sun, Earth, and water.

Name
In the last years of the Soviet Union, as nationalist movements swept throughout the Caucasus, many intellectuals in the North Ossetian ASSR called for the revival of the name of Alania, a medieval kingdom of the Alans. 

The term "Alania" quickly became popular in Ossetian daily life through the names of various enterprises, a TV channel, political and civic organizations, publishing house, football team, etc.  In November 1994, the name "Alania" was officially added to the republic's title (Republic of North Ossetia–Alania).

Geography
The republic is located in the North Caucasus. The northern part of the republic is situated in the Stavropol Plain. 22% of the republic's territory is covered by forests.

Area: 
Borders:
internal: Kabardino-Balkaria (W/NW/N), Stavropol Krai (N), Chechnya (NE/E), Ingushetia (E/SE)
international: Georgia (including South Ossetia; Mtskheta-Mtianeti, Racha-Lechkhumi and Kvemo Svaneti and Shida Kartli) (SE/S/SW)
Highest point: Mount Kazbek
Maximum north–south distance: 
Maximum east–west distance:

Rivers
All of the republic's rivers belong to the drainage basin of the Terek River. Major rivers include:

Terek River (~600 km)
Urukh River (104 km)
Ardon River (101 km)
Kambileyevka River (99 km)
Gizeldon River (81 km)
Fiagdon River
Sunzha River (278 km)

Mountains

All of the mountains located on the territory of the republic are a part of the Caucasus. Mount Kazbek is the highest point (5,033 m), with Mount Dzhimara being the second-highest (4,780 m).

Natural resources
Natural resources include minerals (copper, silver, zinc), timber, mineral waters, hydroelectric power, and untapped reserves of oil and gas.

Climate
The climate is moderately continental.

Average January temperature: 
Average July temperature: 

History

Early history: Kingdom of Alania and Middle Ages
The territory of North Ossetia was first inhabited by Caucasian tribes. Some Nomadic Alans settled in the region in the 7th century, forming the Kingdom of Alania. It was eventually converted to Christianity by missionaries from Byzantium. 

Alania greatly profited from the Silk Road which passed through its territory. At the time of the Mongol invasions of nearby Durdzuketia (modern Chechnya and Ingushetia), the Kingdom of Alania was multiethnic and included Dzurdzuks in its population.

After the Middle Ages, the Mongols' and Tartars' repeated invasions decimated the population, now known as the Ossetians. Islam was introduced to the region in the 17th century by Kabardians.

Russian imperial rule (1806–1917) 
Conflicts between the Khanate of Crimea and the Ottoman Empire eventually pushed Ossetia into an alliance with Imperial Russia in the 18th century. Soon, Russia established a military base in the capital, Vladikavkaz, making it the first Russian-controlled area in the northern Caucasus. By 1806, Ossetia was under complete Russian control.

The Russians' rule led to rapid development of industry and railways which overcame its isolation. The first books from the area came during the late 18th century, and became part of the Terskaya Region of Russia in the mid-19th century.

Soviet period (1917–1990) 
The Russian Revolution of 1917 resulted in North Ossetia being merged into the Mountain Autonomous Soviet Socialist Republic in 1921. It then became the North Ossetian Autonomous Oblast on 7 July 1924, then merged into the North Ossetian Autonomous Soviet Socialist Republic on 5 December 1936. In World War II, it was subject to a number of attacks by Nazi German invaders unsuccessfully trying to seize Vladikavkaz in 1942.

The North Ossetian ASSR declared itself the autonomous republic of the Soviet Union on 20 June 1990. Its name was changed to the Republic of North Ossetia–Alania in 1994.

Russian Federation period (1990–present) 
The dissolution of the Soviet Union posed particular problems for the Ossetian people, who were divided between North Ossetia, which was part of the Russian SFSR, and South Ossetia, part of the Georgian SSR. In December 1990, the Supreme Soviet of the Georgian SSR abolished the autonomous Ossetian enclave amid the rising ethnic tensions in the region, which was further fanned by Moscow; a lot of the conflict zone population, faced with the ethnic cleansing, was forced to flee across the border to either North Ossetia or Georgia proper.

As a result, some 70,000 South Ossetian refugees were resettled in North Ossetia. Additionally, North Ossetia provoked the predominantly Ingush population in the Prigorodny District, which sparked the Ossetian–Ingush conflict. The results of the conflict were that 7,000 Ossetians and 64,000 Ingush refugees had to flee their homes. On 23 March 1995, North Ossetia–Alania signed a power-sharing agreement with the federal government, granting it autonomy. However, this agreement was abolished on 2 September 2002. 

Following the de facto independence of South Ossetia, there have been proposals in this state of joining Russia and uniting with North Ossetia. As well as dealing with the effects of the conflict in South Ossetia, North Ossetia has had to deal with refugees and the occasional spillover of fighting from the wars around them. This notably manifested in the form of the 2004 Beslan school siege by Chechen terrorists.

Administrative divisions

Economy
In recent years, North Ossetia–Alania's economic development has been successful; the indicators of the republic's social and economic development between 2005 and 2007 revealed a stable growth of all sectors of the economy and major social parameters. The nature and climatic conditions of the republic contribute to the successful development of various economic sectors, which is compounded by the abundance of natural resources. Gross regional product pro capita of the region in 2006 was 61,000 rubles ($2,596) and increased 30% in the 2005–2007 time period. GRP pro capita in 2007 was 76,455 rubles. From 2005 to 2007, the average monthly wage in North Ossetia–Alania doubled, with the actual cash earnings increased by 42.5 percent. In terms of the average monthly wage growth, the Republic ranks first in the North Caucasus.

The regional government's economic priorities include industrial growth, development of small enterprise, spas, and resorts, and strengthening the budgetary and tax discipline.

The largest companies in the region include Elektrozinc, Sevkavkazenergo, Pobedit (tungsten and molybdenum producer).

Natural resources, agriculture, and industry

The most widespread resources are zinc- and lead-containing complex ores. There are deposits of limestone, dolomites, marble, and touchstone. There is also a large availability of construction materials, such as clay, sand, and gravel. The local oil deposit reserves are estimated at 10 million metric tons.

The agricultural sector is varied and specializes in the cultivation of wheat, corn, and sunflowers; horticulture; viticulture; and cattle and sheep breeding.

North Ossetia's industry is mainly concentrated in Vladikavkaz. Major companies located here include Elektrotsink, Gazoapparat, an instrument-making plant, Elektrokontraktor, a factory producing automotive electrical equipment, a large-panel construction complex, and companies in the food industry. The Sadonsky industrial center has grown around the mining and forest industries.

Tourism

Despite the proximity to Chechnya, North Ossetia is making efforts to develop its tourist industry. Projects under a program for spa, resort, and tourism development have been successfully implemented in the mountainous part of the republic, according to the head of the regional government. There are nearly 3,000 historical monuments in the Republic and more than half of its area is occupied by Alania National Park, the North Ossetia National Preserve, and game preserves. 

There are more than 250 therapeutic, mineral, and freshwater springs in the republic with estimated daily reserves of 15,000 cubic meters. Besides providing the basis for health spas, these mineral waters also have the potential to be bottled and sold. North Ossetian mineral waters are known for their unique qualities, as well as special mineral composition.

Infrastructure
In terms of its infrastructure, North Ossetia–Alania ranks second in the Southern Federal District and 10th in the nation. The republic has some of the most extensive telecommunication networks in the North Caucasus region and in Russia. It ranks first in terms of its telecom network installations in the Southern Federal District.

The republic ranks fourth in Russia in terms of its paved roads, and its expanding transport and logistics complex provides communication networks between Russia and the South Caucasus, as well as Central Asia. The complex includes two federal highways (Georgian Military Road connects Vladikavkaz with Transcaucasia) running across the Greater Caucasus Range, two customs checkpoints for cars, a developed railway network, Vladikavkaz international airport, and well-equipped transport terminals.

Demographics
Population: 

Number of refugees: 12,570

Life expectancy:

Settlements

Vital statistics

Ethnic groups
The majority of the population of North Ossetia are Christians who belong to the Russian Orthodox Church, although there is also a Muslim minority who are of Ossetian-speaking origin.

According to the 2021 Census, Ossetians make up 68.1% of the republic's population. Other groups include Russians (18.9%), Ingush (3.8%), Kumyks (2.8%), Armenians (1.8%), Georgians (1.0%), and a host of smaller groups, each accounting for less than 1% of the total population.

Languages

There are two official languages in North Ossetia: Russian, which is official in all Russian territory, and Ossetian. Ossetian is an Indo-European language, belonging to the East Iranian group. Ossetian is one of the few Iranic languages spoken natively in Europe. Russian, acting as a lingua franca in the region, is an East Slavic language and as such also belongs to the Indo-European family, which means the two languages are related, albeit distantly.

Religion

According to a 2012 survey which interviewed 56,900 people, 49% of the population of North Ossetia–Alania adheres to the Russian Orthodox Church, 10% declare to be unaffiliated Christian believers, 2% are either Orthodox Christian believers who do not belong to churches or members of non-Russian Orthodox bodies. The second-largest religion is Ossetian ethnic religion, generally called Uatsdin (Уацдин, "True Faith"), a Scythian religion organized into movements such as the Atsætæ Church, comprising 29% of the population. Muslims constitute 4% of the population, and Protestants the 1%. In addition, 1% of the population declares to be "spiritual but not religious" and 3% to be atheist.

Education

The most important facilities of higher education include North Caucasus State Technological University, North Ossetian State University, North Ossetian State Medical Academy, and Mountain State Agrarian University – all in Vladikavkaz.

Politics

During the Soviet period, the high authority in the republic was shared between three people; the first secretary of the North Ossetia Communist Party of the Soviet Union (CPSU) Committee (who in reality had the biggest authority), the chairman of the oblast Soviet (legislative power), and the Chairman of the Republic Executive Committee (executive power). Since 1991, CPSU lost all the power, and the head of the Republic administration, and eventually the governor was appointed/elected alongside elected regional parliament.

The Charter of the Republic of North Ossetia–Alania is the fundamental law of the region. The Parliament of North Ossetia–Alania is the republic's regional standing legislative (representative) body. The Legislative Assembly exercises its authority by passing laws, resolutions, and other legal acts and by supervising the implementation and observance of the laws and other legal acts passed by it. The highest executive body is the Republic's Government, which includes territorial executive bodies such as district administrations, committees, and commissions that facilitate development and run the day to day matters of the province. The Oblast administration supports the activities of the Governor who is the highest official and acts as guarantor of the observance of the krai Charter in accordance with the Constitution of Russia.

The head of government in the Republic of North Ossetia–Alania is the Head of the Republic. The current head of the republic is Sergey Menyaylo. Taymuraz Mamsurov succeeded Alexander Dzasokhov as head on 31 May 2005 following the Beslan school siege.

Culture
There are six professional theaters in North Ossetia–Alania, as well as Ossetian State Philharmonia.

Gallery

See also
South Ossetia
Kosta Khetagurov
Ossetian music
Styr Nyxas

References

Notes

Sources

External links 

 Official website of the Republic of North Ossetia–Alania 
 (archived) Official website of the Parliament of the Republic of North Ossetia–Alania 
 

 
1991 establishments in Russia
North Caucasian Federal District
North Caucasus
Ossetia
Regions of Europe with multiple official languages
Russian-speaking countries and territories
States and territories established in 1991